Azas Plateau is a volcanic field in Russia. It is also known as East Tuva Plateau, Khamsara-Biykhem Plateau and Northeast Tuva Plateau. Volcanic activity in the area also occurred at the Oka Plateau and the Jom-Bolok volcanic field.

The field is formed by a late Pliocene lava plateau. Several volcanoes formed under the influence of ice and are constructed by lava flows and hyaloclastite, these are so-called tuyas which form by eruptions of volcanoes into ice. Ice meltwater floods may have accompanied this activity. The youngest dated volcanic centre was active 48,000 ± 20,000 years ago, but some lava flows may be even younger.

Geography 
The field is located in southern Siberia, between the East Sayan Mountains and the Todzha basin. Volcanic landforms include cones, lava fields, tuyas, and other volcanic structures including scoria cones, volcanic dykes, volcanic necks and volcanic vents. Other landforms are cirques and U-shaped valleys left by previous glaciations. The Bii Khem river, a tributary of the Yenisei River, crosses the field. Politically the field belongs to the Tuva Republic of Russia, and is in a remote area where access is difficult. The volcanoes were first described between 1850–1900.

Geological context 
Activity in the rift zone started in the Oligocene and reached its maximum during the Miocene. Together with the Oka Plateau, the Azas Plateau forms the East Sayan province of the Baikal Rift Zone. Activity in the Azas Plateau has been influenced by a tectonic graben in the area. The Azas Plateau is the largest lava field in the Tuva volcanic province. The Jom-Bolok volcanic field may be related to the Azas Plateau.

Geomorphology 
A large lava field with thicknesses of   formed during the Late Pliocene, when the largest eruptions took place. Nine volcanoes bearing evidence of having formed beneath ice are found in the southeastern part of the field. Ash cones formed on the individual edifices. The lava flows on the table-shaped volcanoes also display rounded hollows. Many volcanoes appear to be part of a lineament. Volcanism may be influenced by strike-slip faults associated with the Jom-Bolok fault.

Individual volcanoes in the Azas Plateau volcanic field include the Derbi-Taiga tuya, which is formed by several layers of hyaloclastite and lava flows and displays a prominent "winged" topography. Pillow lavas also exist. A system of ancient valleys formed by floods are found near to Derbi-Taiga. Ulug-Arginskii is a cone that formed exposed in the air. The cone is accompanied by a maar with a lake to the south, and a lava flow from the cone reached  in length. Lava lakes formed in two craters on the volcano. Shivit-Taiga too is accompanied by a topography that indicates that ancient floods passed there.

Some volcanoes have been affected by landsliding, gully formation and glaciation after their formation. Likewise, the field has been affected by erosion, forming deep valleys with glacier deposits.

Effects of glaciation 
The Azas Plateau was affected by an ice sheet which formed on the East Sayan mountains during the Pleistocene. When volcanoes erupt into ice, the ice melts and volcanic structures named tuyas can form in meltwater lakes. Runny lavas can form such edifices, which tend to have steep slopes, only when trapped within ice. During tuya activity, the subaqueous activity forms hyaloclastite and when the activity occurs in the air lava flows are formed, including lava deltas. Some of the tuyas in the Azas Plateau may have formed through complex eruptive processes. Based on the tuyas of the Tuvan field, it has been determined that ice thicknesses in the area exceeded  and that at least three different ice ages occurred in the field. The tuyas in the Azas plateau have been compared to volcanic edifices in the Valles Marineris on Mars. Non-tuya volcanic ice interaction landforms are also found, such as Albine-Bondok, Charash-Dag and Sagan which are subglacial mounds. Glaciation was already in progress under marine isotope stage 5 (127,000 - 71,000 years ago) and by the stage 4 (71,000 - 57,000 years ago) it was continuous over the Azas Plateau. Glacier retreat was underway by the isotope stage 3 (57,000 - 24,000 years ago), when some volcanoes formed in the air.

Composition 
Volcanism is overall basaltic, volcanic rocks erupted by the Azas Plateau include basalt and trachybasalt. Other volcanoes in the Baikal Rift Zone have erupted the same rocks. These rocks are alkaline and their texture is aphyric. Minerals contained in the rocks include augite, clinopyroxene, olivine, plagioclase, titanium-containing magnetite and nepheline in the more alkaline rocks. Hematite is present in the rocks and gives many tuyas a red colour. Volcaniclastic rocks were originally considered to be tuffs. Cumulates and xenoliths from the mantle have been found at some volcanoes.

Chronology 
Volcanic activity in the Azas Plateau commenced during the Late Pliocene. Activity continued into the Holocene. Before volcanism of the Azas Plateau started, volcanism occurred in the Oka plateau. The Azas trough formed in the Miocene-Pliocene.

The first volcanic activity beginning 2 million years ago formed voluminous lava flows from fissure vents. Later the activity focused on deep seated lineaments. Volcanic activity between 1.65 - 1.75 mya occurred beneath ice in the ancient valleys of the Bii Khem river. In the middle-late Pleistocene volcanism occurred in the southeastern parts of the field. Some dates obtained on edifices in the Azas Plateau are 725,000 ± 50,000 - 760,000 ± 50,000 years for Derbi-Taiga, 600,000 - 560,000 years for Kadyr-Sugskii, 600,000 - 290,000 for some volcanoes surrounding Derbi-Taiga, 350,000 - 290,000 for Yurdawa between Derbi-Taiga and Shivit-Taiga, 225,000 ± 50,000 for Ploskii, 150,000 ± 50,000 for Kokhemskii, 130,000 ± 40,000 - 110,000 ± 000 for Shivit-Taiga, 75,000 ± 40,000 for Priozernyi,  60,000 ± 40,000 for Sorug-Chushku-Uzu and 48,000 ± 20,000 for Ulug-Arginskii. Some lava flows in the Bii-Khem valley are even younger than the Ulug-Arginskii volcano. It is possible that when eruptions in the Azas Plateau occurred beneath ice, they caused floods of glacial meltwater called Jokulhlaup; corresponding landforms have been found at Derbi-Taiga and Shivit-Taiga volcanoes.

References

Sources 
 
 
 
 
 
 
 
 
 
 

Volcanic fields
Pliocene volcanism
Pleistocene volcanism
Holocene volcanism
Landforms of Tuva
Volcanoes of Russia